William McNab may refer to:

 William Ramsay McNab (1844–1889), Scottish physician and botanist
 William McNab (engineer) (1855–1923), railway engineer
 William McNab (footballer) (1870–?), Scottish footballer